, provisional designation  is a highly eccentric trans-Neptunian object, retrograde centaur and damocloid from the outer regions of the Solar System. It was discovered on 8 June 2013 by astronomers with the Mount Lemmon Survey at the Mount Lemmon Observatory in Arizona, United States. It was numbered in 2016 and has not been named since.

Orbit and classification 

 orbits the Sun at a distance of 8.7–353.1 AU once every 2434 years (888,879 days; semi-major axis of 180.92 AU). Its orbit has an exceptionally high eccentricity of 0.95 and an inclination of 125° with respect to the ecliptic. The body's observation arc begins with its official discovery observation at Mount Lemmon in June 2013.

TNO, centaur and damocloid 
With a semi-major axis larger than that of Neptune,  is generically classified as a trans-Neptunian object. It is also considered an (extended) centaur, due to its eccentric orbit with a low perihelion of 8.7 AU and a higher-than-90°-inclination, which gives it a retrograde orbit.

Numbering and naming 

This distant minor planet was numbered by the Minor Planet Center on 20 June 2016. As of 2018, it has not been named.

Physical characteristics

Diameter and albedo 

According to the Johnston's archive and astronomer Michael Brown,  measures 106 and 114 kilometers in diameter, based on an absolute magnitude of 8.1 and an assumed albedo for the body's surface of 0.08 and 0.09, respectively. According to Brown,  is "probably not" a dwarf planet. As of 2018, no physical characteristics have been determined from photometric observations. The body's rotation period, pole and shape remain unknown.

References

External links 
 List Of Centaurs and Scattered-Disk Objects, Minor Planet Center
 Discovery Circumstances: Numbered Minor Planets (465001)-(470000) – Minor Planet Center
 Asteroid (468861) 2013 LU28, Small Bodies Data Ferret
 
 

468861
468861
468861
468861
20130608
Minor planets with a retrograde orbit